Marko Radovanović (born 3 April 1996) is a Serbian professional basketball player for Cedevita Olimpija of the Slovenian League.

Early career 
Radovanović grew up with KK Mladost Čačak youth system. In 2013, he joined the Crvena zvezda U18 team. He won the 2014 Euroleague NIJT.

Professional career 
In April 2014, Radovanović signed a four-year professional contract for Crvena zvezda. Prior to the 2014–15 season he was loaned to FMP where he played for two seasons. In summer 2016, Radovanović was loaned to his hometown team Borac for the 2016–17 season. In June 2017, Radovanović was loaned to FMP.

On July 2, 2021, he has signed with Cedevita Olimpija of the Slovenian League.

National team career
Radovanović was a member of the Serbian under-16 team that won the bronze medal the 2012 FIBA Europe Under-16 Championship in Latvia and Lithuania. Over four tournament games, he averaged 2.8 points and 3.8 rebounds per game. Radovanović was a member of the Serbian under-18 team that won the silver medal at the 2014 FIBA Europe Under-18 Championship in Konya, Turkey. Over nine tournament games, he averaged 5.2 points, 4.2 rebounds and 0.4 assists per game. Radovanović was a member of the Serbian under-20 team that competed at the 2016 FIBA Europe Under-20 Championship in Helsinki, Finland. Over nine tournament games, he averaged 4.4 points, 1.4 rebounds and 0.9 assists per game.

References

External links
 Profile at eurobasket.com
 Profile at euroleague.net

1996 births
Living people
ABA League players
Basketball League of Serbia players
Basketball players from Čačak
KK Cedevita Olimpija players
KK Crvena zvezda youth players
KK Borac Čačak players
KK FMP players
Power forwards (basketball)
Serbian expatriate basketball people in Slovenia
Serbian men's basketball players